Rivers and creeks in Lake County, California are listed below by river basin and alphabetically. 
Unless otherwise stated, the information is taken from the Geographic Names Information System maintained by the United States Geological Survey. 
Coordinates, elevations and lengths from this source are approximate.

General

The rugged topography includes hills, mountains and valleys.
The three main drainages are Eel River, Cache Creek and Putah Creek, each of which have their headwaters in the county.
Eel River drains the north of the county and flows west into Mendocino County.
The center of the county drains into Clear Lake, which drains into Cache Creek, which flows east into Yolo County.
The south of the county drains into Putah Creek, which flows south into Napa County.
Eel River empties into the Pacific, while Cache Creek and Putah Creek flow into the Sacramento River valley.

Lake County has warm, dry summers, and cool, moist winters. 
In the summer, a continual tropical air mass typically creates high daytime temperatures and cool evening temperatures. 
In winter, a marine air mass typically keeps temperatures above .
Average monthly temperatures range from about 43°F during December through January to about 73°F during July through August.
There are greater levels of precipitation at higher elevations and in the north and southwest of the county.
Almost 90% of precipitation falls in winter, and there is very little rain from May to September.

Geological changes

Clear Lake formed about 600,000 years ago as the land in the region began to subside when the Clear Lake Volcanic Field erupted.
Its basin continues to move downward, while sedimentation keeps it shallow.
The Clear Lake basin lies between the watersheds of the Sacramento River and the Russian River.
When it was formed it drained east into the Sacramento Valley.

About 200,000 years ago the Clear Lake Volcanic Field blocked the lake's outlet.
The lake rose until it found a new outlet, draining west through the Blue Lakes into Cold Creek and the Russian River.
Clear Lake was almost  higher than it is today, and Scotts Creek flowed into the lake from the west near where Lakeport is today.
It formed a large delta there, which deposited the Lakeport ridge.

At some time in the last 10,000 years a landslide at the west end of the Blue Lakes blocked Clear Lake's outlet to the Russian River watershed.
The lake rose again, and created its present outlet via Cache Creek to the Sacramento River.
Cache Creek began eroding upstream to Clear Lake, and when it reached the lake the outflow along Cache Creek quickly eroded a channel through soft sediments.
The lake dropped almost  as a result.

Basins

Eel River

Eel River flows through the northern part of the County and drains through Lake Pillsbury into Mendocino County.
The Eel River’s drainage includes Corbin Creek, Anderson Creek, Cold Creek and Bear Creek. 
The drainage includes the highest point in Lake County, Snow Mountain.
The Pacific Gas and Electric Company created Lake Pillsbury on the Eel River as part of its Potter Valley Project, which diverts water downstream on the Eel River to generate power, and releases the water into the East Fork Russian River. 
Diverted flows supplement Russian River water supplies in Mendocino and Sonoma Counties. 
Lake Pillsbury captures about one percent of the Eel River flow.

Clear Lake

Clear Lake is the largest freshwater lake wholly within the state of California. 
Many important tributary streams drain into Clear Lake, including Kelsey Creek, Adobe Creek, Scotts Creek and Middle Creek. 
The streams flow over permeable geologic formations and percolate into the subsurface as groundwater recharge.

Cache Creek

Cache Creek drains Clear Lake and flows eastward into Yolo County, then into the Sacramento River.
Cache Creek has two major reaches in Lake County: the north fork and the main branch. 
The north fork drains an area north of the Clear Lake watershed through Indian Valley Reservoir, and includes Long Valley Creek, Wolf Creek, and Bartlett Creek. 
The main branch drains Clear Lake and flows eastward into Yolo County.
Kelsey Creek, Adobe Creek, Scott’s Creek, and Middle Creek drain through Clear Lake to the main stem of Cache Creek.

Clear Lake and the Indian Valley Reservoir heavily influence the flow characteristics of Cache Creek. 
Unmanaged flows above the Indian Valley Reservoir on Cache Creek show a strong response to rainfall and low base flows. 
In contrast, managed flows on Cache Creek below the Indian Valley Reservoir and Clear Lake show a reduced influence of precipitation and increased base flows.

Putah Creek

Putah Creek drains the southwestern portion of Lake County, draining into Lake Berryessa in Napa County.
Putah Creek’s drainage includes Harbin Creek, Big Canyon Creek, St. Helena Creek and Soda Creek. 
The drainage also includes Collayomi Valley, Long Valley and the Coyote Valley. 
The Putah Creek drainage mostly consists of direct rainfall runoff with a very little snowmelt and base flow. 
The Putah Creek basin in Lake County has no  reservoirs to provide surface storage and regulate flows.

Russian River
A few of the streams in Lake County are in the watershed of the Russian River to the west.

Stony Creek
Stony Creek is a tributary of the Sacramento River that drains a small part of northeast Lake County

Alphabetical list

Notes on source

Unless otherwise stated, the information above is derived from an extract from the GNIS database of features of class "stream" in Lake County, California.
Some anomalies have been corrected:
Rodman Slough is classed "swamp" but is included here since almost half the inflow to Clear Lake comes through the slough.
Cache Creek is classed "canal", perhaps true lower down, and is also included here
Putah Creek is classed "lake" for some reason, but is included here
GNIS says that Pieta Creek is an 11 mile long tributary of Coleman Creek, while Coleman Creek is an 8 mile long tributary of Pieta Creek. In fact, the map shows that Coleman Creek joins Pieta Creek shortly before the combined stream enters the Russian River.
Herman Creek is described as a tributary of Dry Lake, which should read Dry Creek.
The features named Burns Valley, Donovan Valley, Eightmile Valley, Forty Springs Valley, Lyons Valley, Riley Valley and Twin Valley have been omitted, since they are valleys rather than streams.
Some streams have part of their watershed in Lake County, but not their main course. They have been included for the sake of completeness.
Two features named Dutch Oven Creek were found, both tributaries of Corbin Creek. They have been named Dutch Oven Creek E and Dutch Oven Creek W.
Otherwise, where two different creeks have the same name, their parent name has been added in parentheses. Thus Willow Creek (Scotts Creek) is a tributary of Scotts Creek
With Manning Creek the GNIS entry states correctly that it flows into Clear Lake, but gives a mouth location some distance from the lake and gives a mouth elevation of  1,378 feet, while the Clear Lake elevation is given as 1,325 feet. Other tributaries of Clear Lake such as Molesworth Creek are given mouth elevations of up to 1,332 feet.
It seems plausible that elevations in GNIS are estimated from distance to the nearest higher and lower contour lines. This would result in points at the base and the top of a cliff being given elevations that are too high or too low.

Notes

Citations

Sources